A Free Soul is a 1931 American pre-Code drama film that tells the story of an alcoholic San Francisco defense attorney who must defend his daughter's ex-boyfriend on a charge of murdering the mobster she had started a relationship with, who he had previously gotten an acquittal for on a murder charge. Directed by Clarence Brown it stars Norma Shearer, Leslie Howard, Lionel Barrymore, and Clark Gable.

A Free Soul became famous for Barrymore's climactic courtroom monologue that is said to be the main reason he won the Academy Award for Best Actor at the 4th Academy Awards that year.  Gable made such an impression in the role of a gangster who pushes Shearer around that he was catapulted from supporting player to leading man, a position he held for the rest of his career.

Plot
Defense lawyer Stephen Ashe successfully defends known gangster Ace Wilfong from a murder charge, despite his knowledge of Ace's other illegal activities. His upper-class family has all but disowned him and his daughter Jan, due to Stephen's alcoholism and Jan's free spirited willfulness. Jan is engaged to clean-cut Dwight Winthrop, but their relationship is threatened when she meets Ace and becomes enamored of him and his exciting life.

As Stephen continues to slip deeper into alcoholism, Jan breaks her engagement with Dwight and begins a clandestine affair with Ace, which grows into love. This comes to a head when Ace asks a drunken Stephen if he can marry Jan; Stephen, offended by the request, angrily refuses, and when he discovers Jan in Ace's boudoir, takes her home. They have an argument over their respective vices, and Jan proposes a deal: she will never see Ace again if Stephen will give up drinking. Despite knowing he cannot keep his promise, Stephen agrees, and the two of them leave for a cleansing camping holiday, along with Stephen's fiercely loyal assistant Eddie.

After three months of sobriety, Stephen buys a bottle of liquor and boards a train for an unknown destination. Jan returns home to find her family has cut her off; feeling despondent, she visits Ace. He reacts angrily and possessively to her return and informs her that they will be married the next day. Jan slowly realizes what sort of man he really is, and sneaks away. Ace follows her to her apartment and, after a brief confrontation involving Eddie and Dwight, threatens Jan that she cannot get out of marrying him, and that if she marries Dwight he (Ace) will make sure Dwight is killed.

Dwight goes to Ace's gambling club and kills him, then turns himself in for the murder. He tells the police that it was over a gambling debt, to protect Jan's reputation even though it will mean his own execution. Jan finds Stephen in a flophouse, seriously ill from his drinking binge, and brings him to Dwight's trial. Over the objections of both Dwight and the prosecuting attorney, Stephen puts Jan on the witness stand and brings out the full details of her relationship with Ace, and the true reason Dwight killed him. In an emotional appeal to the jury, Stephen takes the blame for everything that happened, explaining that his alcoholism meant that he had failed to be a proper father to Jan until it was too late. He then collapses to the floor, dead.

Dwight is acquitted and, as Jan prepares to leave for a new life in New York, promises to follow her.

Cast
 Norma Shearer as Jan Ashe
 Leslie Howard as Dwight Winthrop
 Lionel Barrymore as Stephen Ashe
 Clark Gable as Ace Wilfong
 James Gleason as Eddie
 Lucy Beaumont as Grandma Ashe

Production
A Free Soul was written by John Meehan (dialogue continuity) and Becky Gardiner (adaptation) from the 1928 play by Willard Mack, which was based on the 1927 novel A Free Soul by Adela Rogers St. Johns. However, according to MGM publicity material, the story on which this film was based first appeared serially in Hearst's International with Cosmopolitan magazine from September 1926 to February 1927. Although onscreen credits list only the book by St. Johns, contemporary reviews list both the novel and Willard Mack's play.

Reception
The Canadian Pharmacists Association protested what they claimed was an unfair portrayal of druggists in the film. Minor deletions were made in the film by local censors following its release, and Ireland banned the film altogether. In 1936, the Production Code Administration recommended that the studio withdraw its application for reissue certification of the picture or face a possible rejection.

A Free Soul was voted "One of the Ten Best Pictures of 1931" in a poll by Film Daily.

Box office
The film was a big hit. According to MGM records, it earned $889,000 in the U.S. and Canada and $533,000 in other markets, resulting in a profit of $244,000.

Academy Awards
Wins
 Best Actor: Lionel Barrymore

Nominations
 Best Directing: Clarence Brown
 Best Actress: Norma Shearer

Home media
A Free Soul was released on DVD by Warner Home Video on March 8, 2008 (along with The Divorcee, also starring Norma Shearer), as one of five Pre-Code films in the "TCM Archives - Forbidden Hollywood Collection, Vol. 2" DVD box set.

See also
Lionel Barrymore filmography
Norma Shearer filmography
Clark Gable filmography

References

External links

A Free Soul at TV Guide (a revised version of 1987 write-up originally published in The Motion Picture Guide)
Stills at pre-code.com

1931 films
1931 drama films
1930s legal films
American black-and-white films
American courtroom films
American legal drama films
Films about alcoholism
Films based on American novels
American films based on plays
Films directed by Clarence Brown
Films featuring a Best Actor Academy Award-winning performance
Films produced by Irving Thalberg
Films set in San Francisco
Metro-Goldwyn-Mayer films
Films based on works by Adela Rogers St. Johns
1930s English-language films
1930s American films